Edinburgh Park is an out-of-town business park in South Gyle,  Edinburgh, Scotland.  It is west of the city, near Edinburgh Airport and adjacent to the Edinburgh City Bypass. It was opened in 1995.  The layout of the park was masterplanned by American architect Richard Meier.  Edinburgh Park railway station, which is on the Glasgow to Edinburgh via Falkirk Line, opened in December 2003. Edinburgh Gateway station on the Fife Circle Line is also nearby (15 mins walk).

Edinburgh Trams began serving the park on 31 May 2014 with stops at Edinburgh Park Station, Edinburgh Park Central and The Gyle.

The park has a bar/grill, nursery, and several sculptures, including busts of famous Scottish poets, many of them socialists.

In 2022, the owners announce plans to greatly expand the number of sculptures and develop the park as a cultural hub as well as a business district., starting with a movie themed bar and performance venue

Businesses

Businesses with a presence in the Edinburgh Park include:

Aegon UK
Lloyds Banking Group
BT
Diageo
HSBC
John Menzies
JP Morgan
Fujitsu
RBS
Regus
Sainsbury's Bank
NetCracker Technology EMEA Ltd
WSP Group

Transport

Road

Edinburgh City Bypass (A720) 

Junction  10: Hermiston Gait
The M8 terminates here at a roundabout under the bypass with access into Edinburgh Park and South Gyle from the south.

Junction 11: Gogar Junction
The end of the city bypass where it links with the A8. This junction provides access into Edinburgh Park and South Gyle from the north.

Rail 

The main Edinburgh-Glasgow railway line runs along the southern border of the park, where it is served by Edinburgh Park station.

Tram 

Edinburgh Park Central tram stop is situated in the parkland between Lochside Avenue and Lochside Crescent.

Buses

Lothian Buses
 2, 12, 21, 22, 36, 300 and 400

McGill's Scotland East
20, 63

Recent developments

In October 2019 construction commenced on the next phase of the Edinburgh Park development by Parabola.

The first phase of the Dixon Jones 48 acre mixed use masterplan for Parabola at Edinburgh Park was approved by Edinburgh Council in September 2018. The detailed application included seven office buildings amounting to over one million square feet of grade A commercial space, leisure and sports facilities, a new public square, shops, bars, restaurants, a health centre, two multi-story car parks, an energy centre and high quality public realm and landscaping. It will be the city’s largest development for more than a decade and includes the first new crossing built across the tram line since the network was opened in 2014. The scheme was described by the Planning Chairman as a welcome development to Edinburgh and Edinburgh Park.

The development is significantly denser than the original vision of Richard Meier, with buildings planned closer together. The already congested Gyle and Gogar roundabouts will be negatively affected at rush hour due to the increased traffic, should residents not choose public transport.

External links
Edinburgh Park official website

References

Areas of Edinburgh
Buildings and structures in Edinburgh
Richard Meier buildings
Business parks of Scotland
1995 establishments in Scotland
Edinburgh Trams stops